Mason Ozail Enigbokan-Bloomfield (born 6 November 1996) is an English professional footballer who plays as a forward for Farnborough.

Career

Dagenham & Redbridge
Bloomfield was born in Westminster but raised in Edgware, and is of Jamaican descent. He played for the Ase Academy based in Edmonton before joining the youth system at Dagenham & Redbridge. In the summer of 2013, he started a two-year scholarship with the club. Whilst still in the youth team, he made his professional debut for the first team in a 2–0 defeat to Northampton Town in September 2014, replacing Matt Partridge as a last-minute substitute despite featuring in a youth team match the same morning. Later in the month he joined Isthmian League Division One North side Chatham Town on loan, making his debut in a 2–0 defeat to Romford. He scored his first goal for the club in a 2–1 victory over Harlow Town. He made his final appearance for the club in a 1–1 draw with Thamesmead Town, having made five appearances scoring once. In October 2014, he was sent out on loan to Southern Counties East Football League side Erith & Belvedere, scoring on his debut with a header in the 3–1 away win over Tunbridge Wells. He only went on to make two more appearances for the club before returning to Dagenham in November. In December 2014 he was moved out on loan again to Maldon & Tiptree of the Isthmian League Division One North.

Non-league
On 28 August 2015, Chelmsford City signed Bloomfield alongside Laurence Vaughan. Mason became dual-registered with Billericay Town during September 2015. In October 2015, Grays Athletic signed Bloomfield from Chelmsford City.

After spells at Witham Town and Brentwood Town in 2016, Bloomfield joined Aveley in December. He scored on his debut for Aveley on 10 December in the 1–0 away win at Soham Town Rangers.

Return to Dagenham & Redbridge
In March 2017, Bloomfield rejoined Dagenham & Redbridge from Aveley.

Norwich City
On 23 March 2018, it was announced that Bloomfield would join Norwich City in the summer of 2018. On 24 June 2018 he joined Scottish side Hamilton Academical on loan from Norwich. He was recalled by Norwich in January 2019. Bloomfield joined AFC Fylde on loan for the remainder of the season on 4 January 2019. He made his debut for the club the following day as a substitute with Fylde trailing 2–1 to Bromley; Bloomfield provided the assist for a Fylde equaliser before being substituted for a compound fracture in his forearm, with Fylde eventually losing 3–2. Bloomfield failed to play again that season.

On 31 May 2019, Bloomfield joined Crawley Town on loan for the 2019–20 season. He made 24 appearances for Crawley across the 2019–20 season and scored 4 goals. He was released by Norwich at the end of the season.

Hartlepool United
Bloomfield signed permanently for Hartlepool United on 5 August 2020. Bloomfield scored his first Hartlepool goal in a 6–0 FA Cup victory at Ilkeston Town. Bloomfield was released by Hartlepool at the end of the season.

Barnet
On 1 July 2021, Bloomfield signed for Barnet. He scored three goals in 21 appearances for the Bees.

Bromley
In February 2022, Bloomfield joined Bromley for an undisclosed fee.

Farnborough
On 1 January 2023, Bloomfield signed for National League South club Farnborough, scoring the winner the same day on his debut in a 2–1 win over Hungerford Town.

Career statistics

Honours
Bromley
FA Trophy: 2021–22

References

External links

1996 births
Living people
Footballers from Westminster
English footballers
Association football forwards
Dagenham & Redbridge F.C. players
Chatham Town F.C. players
Erith & Belvedere F.C. players
Maldon & Tiptree F.C. players
Chelmsford City F.C. players
Grays Athletic F.C. players
Witham Town F.C. players
Brentwood Town F.C. players
Aveley F.C. players
Norwich City F.C. players
Hamilton Academical F.C. players
AFC Fylde players
Crawley Town F.C. players
Hartlepool United F.C. players
Barnet F.C. players
Bromley F.C. players
Farnborough F.C. players
English Football League players
National League (English football) players
Isthmian League players
Scottish Professional Football League players
English people of Jamaican descent